The 1932 All-Ireland Minor Football Championship was the fourth staging of the All-Ireland Minor Football Championship, the Gaelic Athletic Association's premier inter-county Gaelic football tournament for boys under the age of 18.

Kerry entered the championship as defending champions.

On 18 September 1932, Kerry won the championship following a 3-8 to 1-3 defeat of Laois in the All-Ireland final. This was their second All-Ireland title overall and their second in succession.

Results

All-Ireland Minor Football Championship

Semi-Finals

Final

References

1929
All-Ireland Minor Football Championship